Annika Madsen Dries (born February 10, 1992) is an American water polo player. She won the national championship with Stanford University in 2011, and went on to win the gold medal with the United States in the 2012 Summer Olympics.

Career

High school
Dries played water polo for Laguna Beach High School in Laguna Beach, California, before graduating in 2009. She was the team's captain in her junior and senior years. She also started playing for the U.S. junior national team in 2006 and was named a Junior Olympics All-American in 2007 and 2008.

College
Dries enrolled in Stanford University and played on the water polo team in 2010 and 2011. As a freshman, she was tied for third on the team with 35 goals. The following season, she led the team with 65 goals and scored five times in the national championship game against California, which Stanford won. She was named MVP of the NCAA championships. She also won the Peter J. Cutino Award as the nation's top female collegiate player.

Dries took a leave of absence from school in 2012 so she could train with the U.S. national water polo team.

International
In 2010, Dries helped the U.S. win the FINA World League Super Final and the FINA World Cup. The following year, she scored eight goals in the Pan American Games, as the U.S. won the tournament and qualified for the 2012 Summer Olympics. The U.S. went on to win the gold medal at the Olympics, as well.

Personal
Dries was born in La Jolla (a neighborhood in San Diego, California), to Eric Dries and Pamela Madsen. She plays volleyball and tennis. She is an advocate for breast cancer awareness and research.

See also
 United States women's Olympic water polo team records and statistics
 List of Olympic champions in women's water polo
 List of Olympic medalists in water polo (women)

References

External links
 

1992 births
Living people
American female water polo players
Water polo centre forwards
Water polo players at the 2012 Summer Olympics
Medalists at the 2012 Summer Olympics
Olympic gold medalists for the United States in water polo
Water polo players at the 2011 Pan American Games
Pan American Games medalists in water polo
Pan American Games gold medalists for the United States
Stanford Cardinal women's water polo players
Medalists at the 2011 Pan American Games
People from La Jolla, San Diego
Sportspeople from San Diego